The year 1948 in architecture involved some significant events.

Events
 Le Modulor by Le Corbusier is published.

Buildings and structures

Buildings
 September 10 – The Tripler Army Medical Center in Honolulu, Hawaii, United States is dedicated.
 December – Carswell House in Newark, Delaware, by Edward Durell Stone, completed.
 Mile High Stadium in Denver, Colorado completed.
 V. C. Morris Gift Shop (later, Xanadu Gallery) in San Francisco, by Frank Lloyd Wright.
 Morannedd Café (later, Dylan's), Criccieth Esplanade, Wales, by Clough Williams-Ellis, built (approximate date).
 Mampong Teacher's Training College and Prempeh College, Kumasi, both in Ghana, by Maxwell Fry and Jane Drew.
 Burleigh Primary School, Cheshunt, England, by Mary Crowley, opened.
 Equitable Building (Portland, Oregon), by Pietro Belluschi, completed.
 Holy Family Old Cathedral (Anchorage, Alaska), by Augustine A. Porreca, is completed.
 Calvert Manor apartment building in Arlington, Virginia, by Mihran Mesrobian, built.
 Bachman House in Chicago, remodeling by Bruce Goff, completed.
 Ledbetter House in Norman, Oklahoma, by Bruce Goff, completed.
 Elkay Apartments in Los Angeles, California, by Richard Neutra, built.
 Herman T. Mossberg Residence in South Bend, Indiana, by Frank Lloyd Wright, built.
 Herbert and Katherine Jacobs Second House in Madison, Wisconsin, by Frank Lloyd Wright, completed.
 Jack Lamberson House in Oskaloosa, Iowa, designed by Frank Lloyd Wright, built.
 Haines Shoe House in Hallam, Pennsylvania, built.

Awards
 AIA Gold Medal – Charles Donagh Maginnis
 Olympic gold medal – Adolf Hoch of Austria for Ski jumping hill on the Kobenzl
 Olympic silver medal – Alfred Rinesch of Austria for Watersports centre in Karinthia
 Olympic bronze medal – Nils Olsson of Sweden for Baths and sporting hall in Gothenburg
 RIBA Royal Gold Medal – Auguste Perret

Births
March 15 – Gavin Stamp, British architectural historian
October 6 – Ken Yeang, Malaysian ecoarchitect
December 3 – Maxwell Hutchinson, English architect
Louis D. Astorino, American architect
Miguel Cabrera Cabrera, Spanish architect and politician working in the Canaries
Michael Sorkin, American architect and theorist (died 2020)

Deaths
January 19
Ignjat Fischer, Croatian architect (born 1870)
Tony Garnier, French architect (born 1869)
January 22 – Sir Alfred Brumwell Thomas, English architect (born 1868)
February 2 – Sir Charles Herbert Reilly, English architect and teacher (born 1874)
March 29 – Olev Siinmaa, Estonian-Swedish architect (born 1881)
June 16 – Horace Field, English architect (born 1861)
August 1 – George Skipper, English architect (born 1856)
August 20 – Emery Roth, Hungarian-born American architect (born 1871)
September 3 – Frank Mills Andrews, American architect (born 1867)
October – Benedict Williamson, English-born architect and Roman Catholic priest (born 1868)
October 1 – Adolf Szyszko-Bohusz, Polish architect (born 1883)
October 27 – Albert Randolph Ross, American architect (born 1868)
John Robert Dillon, American architect

References